Evergreen Cemetery is a cemetery located in Morristown, in Morris County, New Jersey, United States.

Notable interments
 Frank D. Abell (1878–1964), banker and politician
 Joseph Bushnell Ames (1878–1928), writer 
 George T. Cobb (1813–1870), represented New Jersey's 4th congressional district from 1861 to 1863, and Mayor of Morristown from 1865 to 1869.
 Philip H. Cooper (1844–1912), United States Navy rear admiral, Superintendent of the United States Naval Academy from 1894 to 1898 and Commander-in-Chief of the United States Asiatic Fleet from March to July 1904
 Augustus William Cutler (1827–1897), member of the U.S. House of Representatives from New Jersey from 1875 to 1879.
 George Goelet Kip, lawyer 
 Emile Henry Lacombe (1846–1924), judge who served on the United States Court of Appeals for the Second Circuit.
 James H. McGraw (1860–1948), co-founder of what is now The McGraw-Hill Companies.
 Alice Duer Miller (1874–1942), poet, author of The White Cliffs  (1940)
 Mahlon Pitney (1858–1924), Associate Justice of the Supreme Court of the United States
 Theodore Fitz Randolph (1826–1883), United States Senator.
 George Theodore Werts (1846–1910), Governor of New Jersey from 1893 to 1896.

References

External links
 Evergreen Cemetery at Find a Grave
 Political Graveyard interments at Evergreen Cemetery

Cemeteries in Morris County, New Jersey
Morristown, New Jersey